Littlehempston is a village and civil parish in the South Hams District of Devon in England consisting of 83 households, with a population of 207 in the parish. It has also been called Little Hempston and Hempston Arundel.

The village has many old fashioned cottages and buildings. Its church is on the hill within the village and is near to where a footpath begins, taking walkers through two miles of fields and woodland to Totnes.

The village has two public houses. The Tally Ho is in the centre of the village, just below the church; and The Pig & Whistle is on the A381 road to Totnes.

There is also a public phone box and noticeboard, located next to the post box just in front of a brook which eventually leads to the River Dart.

Notable people
 William Vallance Whiteway, QC KCMG (1 April 1828 – 24 June 1908), politician and three time Premier of Newfoundland, was born at Buckyette in the parish.
 Gerald Hine-Haycock, former ITN and BBC News Correspondent; HTV West and BBC West programme presenter, lives at Hempstone Park in the village, and he and his wife, Judy, provide bed-and-breakfast accommodation there.
 Keith Law, Songwriter for Velvett Fogg, lived in the village.

See also
 Totnes (Riverside) railway station

References

External links
Littlehempston website
Tally Ho website
Pig & Whistle website

Villages in South Hams
Civil parishes in South Hams